The Podocalyceae is a tribe of plants under the family Picrodendraceae. It comprises 3 subtribes and 3 genera.

See also
Taxonomy of the Picrodendraceae

References

Picrodendraceae
Malpighiales tribes